In graph theory, the cycle rank of a directed graph is a digraph connectivity measure proposed first by Eggan and Büchi .  Intuitively, this concept measures how close a
digraph is to a directed acyclic graph (DAG), in the sense that a DAG has
cycle rank zero, while a complete digraph of order n with a self-loop at
each vertex has cycle rank n. The cycle rank of a directed graph is closely related to the tree-depth of an undirected graph and to the star height of a regular language. It has also found use
in sparse matrix computations (see ) and logic
.

Definition
The cycle rank r(G) of a digraph  is inductively defined as follows:

 If G is acyclic, then .   
 If G is strongly connected and E is nonempty, then
 If G is not strongly connected, then r(G) is equal to the maximum cycle rank among all strongly connected components of G.
The tree-depth of an undirected graph has a very similar definition, using undirected connectivity and connected components in place of strong connectivity and strongly connected components.

History
and applied to sparse matrix computations .

Examples
The cycle rank of a directed acyclic graph is 0, while a complete digraph of order n with a self-loop at
each vertex has cycle rank n.  Apart from these, the cycle rank of a few other digraphs is known: the undirected path  of order n, which possesses a symmetric edge relation and no self-loops, has cycle rank  .  For the directed -torus , i.e., the cartesian product of two directed circuits of lengths m and n, we have

Computing the cycle rank

Computing the cycle rank is computationally hard:  proves that the corresponding decision problem is NP-complete, even for sparse digraphs of maximum outdegree at most 2. On the positive side, the problem is solvable in time  on digraphs of maximum outdegree at most 2, and in time  on general digraphs. There is an approximation algorithm with approximation ratio .

Applications

Star height of regular languages
The first application of cycle rank was in formal language theory, for studying the star height of regular languages.   established a relation between the theories of regular expressions, finite automata, and of directed graphs.  In subsequent years, this relation became known as Eggan's theorem, cf. .  
In automata theory, a nondeterministic finite automaton with ε-moves (ε-NFA) is defined as a 5-tuple, (Q, Σ, δ, q0, F), consisting of
 a finite set of states Q
 a finite set of input symbols Σ 
 a set of labeled edges δ, referred to as transition relation: Q × (Σ ∪{ε}) × Q.  Here ε denotes the empty word.
 an initial state q0 ∈ Q
 a set of states F distinguished as accepting states F ⊆ Q.
A word w ∈ Σ* is accepted by the ε-NFA if there exists a directed path from the initial state q0 to some final state in F using edges from δ, such that the concatenation of all labels visited along the path yields the word w.  The set of all words over Σ* accepted by the automaton is the language accepted by the automaton A.

When speaking of digraph properties of a nondeterministic finite automaton A with state set Q, we naturally address the digraph with vertex set Q induced by its transition relation.  Now the theorem is stated as follows.

Eggan's Theorem: The star height of a regular language L equals the minimum cycle rank among all nondeterministic finite automata with ε-moves accepting L.

Cholesky factorization in sparse matrix computations
Another application of this concept lies in sparse matrix computations, namely for using nested dissection to compute the Cholesky factorization of a (symmetric) matrix in parallel.  A given sparse -matrix M may be interpreted as the adjacency matrix of some symmetric digraph G on n vertices, in a way such that the non-zero entries of the matrix are in one-to-one correspondence with the edges of G.  If the cycle rank of the digraph G is at most k, then the Cholesky factorization of M can be computed in at most k steps on a parallel computer with  processors .

See also
 Circuit rank

References

.
.
.
.
.
.
.
.

.

Graph connectivity
Graph invariants